This is a list of National Historic Sites in the province of Quebec.  As of July 2019, there were 198 National Historic Sites designated in Quebec, 30 of which are administered by Parks Canada (identified below by the beaver icon .  Sites in the province's two largest cities are listed separately at List of National Historic Sites in Montreal and List of National Historic Sites in Quebec City.

Numerous National Historic Events also occurred in Quebec, and are identified at places associated with them, using the same style of federal plaque which marks National Historic Sites. Several National Historic Persons are commemorated throughout the province in the same way. The markers do not indicate which designation—a Site, Event, or Person—a subject has been given.

This list uses names designated by the national Historic Sites and Monuments Board, which may differ from other names for these sites.

National Historic Sites

See also

History of Quebec
Répertoire du patrimoine culturel du Québec

References

 
Quebec